Beauregard or Beauregarde may refer to:

People 
 Larry Pitchford (born 1936), stage name Beauregarde
 Charles Costa de Beauregard (1835–1909), French historian and politician
 Christopher Beauregard Emery (born 1957), American White House Usher, enterprise architect, and author
 DJ Paul (born 1975), American rapper born Paul Beauregard
 Élie Beauregard (1884–1954), Canadian lawyer and politician
 Georges de Beauregard (1920–1984), French producer
 Gilbert de Beauregard Robinson (1906–1992), Canadian mathematician
 James Beauregard-Smith (fl. late 20th century), Australian life prisoner
 Jean-Nicolas Beauregard (1733–1804), French-born religious leader
 Keith Beauregard (born 1983), American baseball coach
 Nathan Beauregard (1887–1970), American musician
 Olivier Costa de Beauregard (1911–2007), French relativistic and quantum physicist,
 P. G. T. Beauregard (1818–1893), Confederate general, inventor, civic leader
 Pantaléon Costa de Beauregard (1806–1864), French statesman, archaeologist, historian and ornithologist
 Pierre Raphaël Paillot de Beauregard (1734–1799), French general of the French Revolutionary Wars
 Robin Beauregard (born 1979), American amateur athlete, water polo
 Stéphane Beauregard (born 1968), Canadian professional athlete, hockey 
 Miss Violetta Beauregarde, Italian singer and model 
 Harriet Howard (1823–1865), English actress and Comtesse de Beauregard 
 Blanche Lamontagne-Beauregard (1889–1958), Canadian poet
 Paradime (born 1975), American musician born Freddie Beauregard
 Jefferson Beauregard Sessions III (born 1946), Attorney General of the United States

Characters 
Beauregard, offspring of fictional Elsie the Cow
Beauregard (Muppet), theater janitor 
Beauregard the Demon, in the Xanth fantasy novel series
Bo Brady or Beauregard Aurelius Brady, a character on the American soap opera Days of our Lives
Beauregard "Beau" Bennet, outlaw in film Face to Face
Beauregard, "Bo", vampire in Robin Mckinley's novel Sunshine
Beauregard Bottomley, main character in the movie Champagne for Caesar
Beauregard Bugleboy, a recurring character in comic strip Pogo
Beauregard Duke, character from Dukes of Hazzard in short as Bo Duke
 Beauregard Jackson, pilot in Land of the Lost
Beauregard Jackson Pickett Burnside, Southern aristocrat in musical comedy Mame, and in works it was based on
Beauregard LaFeyettane, in American Dad! episode "Irregarding Steve"
Beauregard Langdon, a character in American Horror Story: Murder House
Beauregard Lionett, a human monk in the D&D Web Series Critical Role
Colonel Beauregard, from an episode of The Scooby-Doo Show
Jack Beauregard, gunfighter in film My Name Is Nobody
Kennebrew Beauregard, a character in the movie BlacKkKlansman
Mr. Beauregard, a one-off character in Rick and Morty, season 2, episode 4
Remy Beauregard Hadley, commonly known as "Thirteen", in the House MD television series
Silena Beauregard, a character in Rick Riordan's "Percy Jackson and the Olympians" series
Characters in the book Charlie and the Chocolate Factory:
Violet Beauregarde
Mrs. Beauregarde
Mr. Beauregarde

Places

France
Château de Beauregard (disambiguation), any of several by that name
Beauregard, Ain
Beauregard, Lot
Saint-Jean-de-Beauregard
Beauregard-et-Bassac
Clermont-de-Beauregard
Beauregard-Baret
Beauregard-de-Terrasson
Beauregard-Vendon
Beauregard, Martinique, see List of populated places in Martinique

United States

Louisiana
Beauregard Parish, Louisiana
Beauregard Town, district of Baton Rouge
Camp Beauregard, Army base
Fort Beauregard, Army base

Other
Beauregard, Alabama
Beauregard, Mississippi

Quebec, Canada
Lac Beauregard Water Aerodrome
Sainte-Lucie-de-Beauregard Aerodrome

Other
American "Beauregard", a variety of sweet potato
Château Beauregard, a Pomerol winery
Les Beauregards, a Premier cru vineyard in Chablis
"Beauregard" (song), by RAQ
Beauregard v Canada, court case
Beauregard claim, a type of claim in United States patent prosecution
General Beauregard Lee, American Groundhog's Day icon
USS Beauregard (1861), former Confederate warship

French-language surnames